Amandus Heinrich Adamson (12 November 1855 near Paldiski, Estonia, then Russian Empire — 26 June 1929 in Paldiski, Estonia) was an Estonian sculptor and painter.

Life
Adamson was born in 1855 into an Estonian-speaking seafaring family at Uuga-Rätsepa, near Paldiski by the Gulf of Finland. His father, of local partially Swedish descent and a merchant vessel captain by profession, sailed to the United States in 1860, participated in the American Civil War, but never returned to Estonia and lost contact with his family after 1869.

Adamson excelled in wood carving as a child. He moved to St. Petersburg in 1875 to study at the Imperial Academy of Arts under Alexander Bock. After graduation he continued to work as a sculptor and teacher in St. Petersburg, with an interruption from 1887 through 1891 to study in Paris and Italy, influenced by the French sculptors Jules Dalou and Jean-Baptiste Carpeaux.

Adamson produced his best-known work in 1902: His Russalka Memorial in Tallinn, dedicated to the 177 lost sailors of the Russian warship Rusalka, features a bronze angel on a slender column. Some of his other work is architectural, e.g., his four allegorical bronzes for the Elisseeff department store in St. Petersburg (for architect Gavriil Baranovsky), and the French-style caryatids and finial figures for the Singer House (for architect Pavel Suzor) are major components of the "Russian Art Nouveau" visible along Nevsky Prospekt.

He was named an academician of the Imperial Academy in 1907. In 1911 Adamson, as a result of a competition arranged by the Imperial Academy, received the commission for the monument to the Tricentennial of the House of Romanov. It was to be erected in Kostroma. Adamson invested all of his money into the project, which was never finished due to the 1917 Russian Revolution. In 1918, during the Estonian War of Independence, Adamson returned to his home town of Paldiski in northwestern Estonia, where he would spend most of the rest of his life, except for the larger part of 1922, when he worked in Italy.

During the years of independent Estonia Adamson was commissioned to sculpt multiple monuments dedicated to the War of Independence, including one in Pärnu at the Alevi cemetery, where he himself was ultimately buried. In the 1940s and 1950s, almost all of these monuments were destroyed by the Soviet authorities; since Estonia regained independence in 1991, most of them have been restored.

In addition to war memorials Adamson also created the first monument to an Estonian – Friedrich Reinhold Kreutzwald. Adamson's last work was the monument dedicated to a beloved national poetess Lydia Koidula in Pärnu.

Selected works
The work of Adamson varies in style and material. He sculpted monuments in Estonia, Saint Petersburg and the Crimea, as well as architectural sculpture, allegorical figures, and portraits.

 Fisherman from the Island of Muhu (plaster, 1892)
 In Anxious Expectation (bronze, 1897)
 allegorical sculptures of Commerce, Industry, Science and Arts on the façade of Elisseeff Emporium in St.Petersburg (bronze, 1902)
 The Russalka Memorial, Kadriorg (1902)
 allegorical sculpture for the Singer House, St. Petersburg (1902–1904)
 Tšempion (English: Champion), bronze sculpture of Estonian strongman Georg Lurich (1903)
 Boats Lost at Sea, Sevastopol  (1904)
 Memorial to Estonian painter Johann Köler, Suure-Jaani Cemetery (1912)
 Monument to the Estonian War of Liberation (1928, destroyed 1945)
 Monument to the Estonian poetess Lydia Koidula, Pärnu  (1929)

Gallery

Notes

References

 Amandus Adamson, 1855–1929, by Tiina Nurk, Eesti NSV Kunst (1959)
 Amandus Adamson

External links
Estonian postage stamp

1855 births
1929 deaths
People from Paldiski
People from the Governorate of Estonia
Sculptors from the Russian Empire
Architectural sculptors
19th-century Estonian painters
19th-century Estonian male artists
20th-century Estonian sculptors
20th-century Estonian male artists